Dalla nubes is a species of butterfly in the family Hesperiidae. It is found in Mexico.

References

Butterflies described in 1991
nubes